Columbus station is a railway station that serves Columbus, Wisconsin. The station is served by Amtrak, the national railroad passenger system, with daily service by the Empire Builder line. Beginning in 2024 Columbus will also be served by an additional Chicago-Twin Cities round trip via the new TCMC route with Columbus serving as the Madison area stop along the corridor until additional trackage through Madison via WSOR's Watertown Subdivision and CP's M&P Subdivision is brought up to passenger grade and an additional station in Madison proper is built. This station and the Portage station serve the Madison metropolitan area, with Columbus reckoned as the official stop for Madison proper.

History 
Built in 1906 by the Chicago, Milwaukee, St. Paul and Pacific Railroad (Milwaukee Road), the station is well preserved, and looks much as did when first built.  The station area also includes an older freight station. In 2016, a safety fence was constructed between the two mainline tracks running by the station.

Amenities 
Until 2017, the station was staffed Mondays through Fridays by an Amtrak station agent with full ticketing and baggage handling services. On weekends and holidays, the station was only opened and closed by support staff, and tickets had to be purchased in advance. Baggage service on weekends and holidays was self-serve; passengers checked bags trainside after tagging their own bags at the station.

Since May 2017, however, the station has been unstaffed, even though a large number of Amish passengers used the station and almost always bought their tickets at the window. According to Rod Musel, who was station agent in Columbus from 2004 to 2017, many Amish passengers were likely to drive to the other two staffed stations in the state, Milwaukee or La Crosse. Baggage service is self-serve seven days a week.

, the Empire Builder comes twice a day, heading toward Chicago at 1:47 PM, and toward Seattle or Portland at 5:55 PM.

The depot has a bulletin board with photos of past trips aboard the Empire Builder by former passengers. Also on the wall is a map of Glacier National Park, a popular destination for those travelers on vacation. There is no food service available within the station, but numerous restaurants are located within two blocks of the station. Columbus is not a smoke-break stop for the Empire Builder, and continuing passengers may not step off the train in Columbus.

Statistics

Gallery

See also
 List of intercity bus stops in Wisconsin

References

External links 

 Columbus Amtrak Station (USA Rail Guide - Train Web)

Buildings and structures in Columbia County, Wisconsin
Amtrak stations in Wisconsin
Railway stations in the United States opened in 1906
Former Chicago, Milwaukee, St. Paul and Pacific Railroad stations
Columbus, Wisconsin